The 2015–16 Rhode Island Rams women's basketball team will represent the University of Rhode Island during the 2015–16 college basketball season. The Rams, led by second year head coach Daynia La-Force. The Rams were members of the Atlantic 10 Conference and play their home games at the Ryan Center. They finished the season 12–18, 5–11 in A-10 to finish a 4 way tie for tenth place. They advanced to the quarterfinals of the A-10 women's tournament where they lost to Saint Louis.

2015–16 media
All Rams home games and most conference road games that aren't televised will be shown on the A-10 Digital Network.

Roster

Schedule

|-
!colspan=9 style="background:#75B2DD; color:#002b7f;"| Non-conference regular season

|-
!colspan=9 style="background:#75B2DD; color:#002b7f;"| Atlantic 10 regular season

|-
!colspan=9 style="background:#75B2DD; color:#002B7F;"| Atlantic 10 Women's Tournament

Rankings
2015–16 NCAA Division I women's basketball rankings

See also
 2015–16 Rhode Island Rams men's basketball team

References

Rhode Island Rams women's basketball seasons
Rhode Island
Rhode
Rhode